The 1974–75 Ice hockey Bundesliga season was the 17th season of the Ice hockey Bundesliga, the top level of ice hockey in Germany. 10 teams participated in the league, and Düsseldorfer EG won the championship.

Regular season

References

External links
Season on hockeyarchives.info

Eishockey-Bundesliga seasons
1974–75 in German ice hockey
Ger